The 2013 Supercopa de Chile was the first edition of this championship organised by the ANFP. 

The match was played between the 2013 Torneo de Transición Champion Unión Española, and the 2012–13 Copa Chile Winner Universidad de Chile

Road to the final

The two teams that contested the Supercopa were Unión Española, that qualified as 
2013 Torneo de Transición Champion, and Universidad de Chile, that qualified for the match as the winner of the 2012–13 Copa Chile, defeating Universidad Católica 2:1 at the Estadio Germán Becker.

Details

Champion

References

Club Universidad de Chile matches
Unión Española matches
2013 in Chilean football
Chil